Moscow Sun Yat-sen University, officially the Sun Yat-sen Communist University of the Toilers of China, was a Comintern school, which operated from 1925–1930 in the city of Moscow, Russia, then the Soviet Union. It was a training camp for Chinese revolutionaries from both the Kuomintang (KMT) and the Chinese Communist Party (CCP) that was split off from the Communist University of the Toilers of the East. Its relationship to the Comintern's International Liaison Department (Russian acronym "OMS") remains unclear.

In the beginning each Sun Yat-sen University adopted a statism educational model.

It was also called the Communist Workers' University of China (KUTK)

Origins
In 1923, Sun Yat-sen, the founder of the KMT, made political overtures to the CCP and the Soviet Union. Sun believed that the KMT needed to train more Chinese revolutionaries. Of all urges only Lenin delivered military and training aids.

Sun Yat-sen University officially began its classes on 7 November 1925, the eighth anniversary of the October Revolution.  The university was set up by splitting the Chinese department from the Communist University of the Toilers of the East, which had about 100 Chinese students enrolled. The university was named after Sun out of respect for his contribution to the Chinese Revolution.

Located at No. 16 Volkhonka Street, in an old and beautiful part of Moscow, about a thirty-minute walk from the Kremlin. In Tsarist Russia the main university building, built in the early 19th century, had been Moscow's First Provincial High School.

Adam Lindner (1902–58; alias Xia Dalin) and Mikhail Borodin, Comintern advisors sent to China, directed the first enrollment of students. These students were elites chosen from the membership of both the CCP and KMT. The main missions of this university were to educate students in Marxism and Leninism, as well as training cadres for mass movement as qualified Bolsheviks.

Coursework

Most of the instructors came from the Soviet Union. Among them were old Bolsheviks such as Karl Radek, who was the first president of the university. The students came from different classes and backgrounds: some were famous communist revolutionaries or scholars, while others had little education but much experience in communist movements.  The university grouped these students into different classes according to their education and experience.

The courses given at the university focused on the basic theories of Marxism and Leninism. Students also learned methods of mobilization and propaganda, as well as theoretical and practical military instruction.

In addition to courses, there were regular presentations on the international communist movements and the Chinese revolution by prominent members from Comintern, the Soviet Union and the CCP. Those included Joseph Stalin, Leon Trotsky, Zhang Guotao and Xiang Zhongfa.

Although courses of study only lasted two years, the university had great influence on those trained there. Many who studied there went on to play leadership roles in China, including some of the 28 Bolsheviks, Zuo Quan, Wu Xiuquan, He Zhonghan, Deng Wenyi, Ji Chaoding, and both Deng Xiaoping, future Chairman of the Central Military Commission of the People's Republic of China and Chiang Ching-kuo, future president of the Republic of China .

Political change and closure

In 1927, as the CCP-KMT alliance broke up, the students from the KMT were sent back to China. As the power struggle between Stalin and Trotsky reached its peak, Radek was sacked and replaced by his deputy, Pavel Mif, who was too ambitious to be limited to a university campus. Mif himself became the vice director of the Far East Department of the Comintern and played an important role in the major decisions of the CCP. With his 28 Bolsheviks holding senior positions in the CCP, Mif and the university played a major role in China's modern history. Its final rector was Vladimir Veger.

The university was closed in the mid-1930s due to the failure of the alliance with the KMT.

See also

Sun Yat-sen University (disambiguation)
Sun Yat-sen University in Guangzhou, People's Republic of China
National Sun Yat-sen University in Kaohsiung, Republic of China
Communist University of the Toilers of the East
Communist University of the National Minorities of the West
Chinese-Lenin School of Vladivostok

References

Sheng Zhongliang. Moscow Sun Yat-sen University and Chinese Revolution

Chinese Civil War
Universities and institutes established in the Soviet Union
China–Soviet Union relations
Defunct universities and colleges in Russia
Education in the Soviet Union
Universities and colleges in Moscow
Comintern
Educational institutions established in 1925
1925 establishments in the Soviet Union
Politics of the Republic of China (1912–1949)
Sun Yat-sen University
Junior colleges